, more commonly known as , is a festival in Kyoto, Japan. It is the culmination of the Obon festival on August 16, in which five giant bonfires are lit on mountains surrounding the city. It signifies the moment when the spirits of deceased family members, who are said to visit this world during Obon, are believed to be returning to the spirit world—thus the name .

History
The origins of the festival are obscure, but it is believed to be ancient. Specific families have the hereditary duty of organizing all the logistics of the bonfires, and they spend many hours annually providing volunteer labor to maintain this tradition.

Schedule
Starting at 8 pm, the giant bonfires are lit, each with a distinctive shape. Three of the fires form giant kanji characters, and two form familiar shapes. The characters, their locations, meanings, and the lighting times are:

, the character meaning "large" or "great", is lit on Daimonji-Yama/Higashi-Yama, Nyoigatake at 8 pm;
, the characters meaning "wondrous dharma" (referring to Buddhist teachings), are lit on Matsugasaki, Nishi-Yama/Higashi-Yama at 8:10 pm;
, the shape of a boat, is lit on Nishigamo, Funa-Yama at 8:15 pm;
, again, the character meaning "large", is lit on Daihoku-San, Hidaridaimonji-San at 8:15 pm;
, the shape of a shrine gate, is lit on Toriimoto, Mandara-San at 8:20 pm.

The most famous—and the first to be lit—is the character , on Kyoto's . The other four fires are lit at five to ten-minute intervals, and by 8:30, all the characters can be seen. Each bonfire lasts for 30 minutes.

The 2020 event was significantly scaled back, due to COVID-19, with only six points of  lit and one point lit at each of the other four locations.

Viewing spots
The best place to view the festival is from the Nakagyō Ward, in the center of the city. Many hotels have  specials where, for a fee, one can see all five fires. Many people also like to go to the Kamo River, between Sanjo and Imadegawa Streets, for an excellent view of the initial fires. More specifically, the following spots are mentioned as good viewing spots:

Latitude and longitude

Daimonji: 
Myō: 
Hō: 
Funagata: 
Hidari Daimonji: 
Toriigata:

References

External links

Religion in Kyoto
Tourist attractions in Kyoto
Festivals in Kyoto
Hill figures
Geoglyphs
Buddhist festivals in Japan
Traditions involving fire
Japanese words and phrases